Belosynapsis kewensis is a monocotyledonous plant in the dayflower family. The plant occurs in the far south of India in the Western Ghats.  It is considered endangered or possibly extinct in the Indian state of Tamil Nadu, where it occurs only in the southern districts of Tinnevelly and Kanyakumari. It may be synonymous with Cyanotis beddomei.

References

External links

Commelinaceae
Endangered plants
Endemic flora of India (region)
Plants described in 1871